Polski Fiat 621 was a Polish 2.5-tonne truck, the basic lorry of the Polish Army during the 1930s. A licence-built version of the Italian Fiat 621, it was heavily modified to better suit Polish needs and cope with the bad roads in Poland. The undercarriage was produced in two variants: The Polski Fiat 621 L was the basic variant to receive a number of superstructures while the Polski Fiat 621 R was used as the basis for a line of successful buses for the civilian market and heavier, 3-tonne lorries for the army.

The modifications to the original Fiat design included:
 Strengthened undercarriage (frame, front and rear axles)
 New leaf springs, joints and shock absorbers
 Wider wheelbase
 Redesigned mounting of cab doors
 A Larger fuel tank for both gasoline and diesel versions
 Cylinder block redesigned and produced of high-quality steel
 Weber carburettor replaced with a simpler and easier to maintain construction by Solex

Serial production started in 1935 at the Państwowe Zakłady Inżynieryjne Works and lasted until 1939. In 1940 the production was to be replaced with the PZInż 703 family of trucks. Upon the outbreak of World War II and invasion of Poland, all production ceased; those 621s that were not destroyed in the fighting were captured by Nazi Germany or the Soviet Union as the two occupied the country.

An unspecified number were also used by Romanian Army during WW2.

See also 
C4P

References

Military vehicles of Poland
1930s cars
Fiat vehicles
Military trucks
World War II vehicles of Poland